The men's 100 metre backstroke was a swimming event held as part of the swimming at the 1936 Summer Olympics programme. It was the seventh appearance of the event, which was established in 1908. The competition was held from Wednesday to Friday, 12 to 14 August 1936.

Thirty swimmers from 17 nations competed.

Medalists

Records
These were the standing world and Olympic records (in minutes) prior to the 1936 Summer Olympics.

Adolph Kiefer set a new Olympic record in the first heat with 1:06.9 minutes. He bettered his record in the first semi-final with 1:06.8 minutes. In the final he improved the Olympic record again when he swam 1:05.9 minutes.

Results

Heats

Wednesday 12 August 1936: The fastest three in each heat and the fastest from across the heats advanced to the semi-finals.

Heat 1

Heat 2

Heat 3

Heat 4

Heat 5

Semifinals

Thursday 13 August 1936: The fastest three in each semi-final and the fastest fourth-placed advanced to the final.

Semifinal 1

Semifinal 2

Final

Friday 14 August 1936:

References

External links
Olympic Report
 

Swimming at the 1936 Summer Olympics
Men's events at the 1936 Summer Olympics